The Big Prize is the second album by Honeymoon Suite, released in 1986. It featured four hit singles, including the band's biggest hit in the U.S., "Feel It Again," and "Bad Attitude," which was notably featured in a sequence in the final episode of Miami Vice 4 years later. In 1990 the album was certified Triple Platinum in Canada (in excess of 300,000 copies sold) by the CRIA (Canadian Recording Industry Association).

The album cover features a newly married couple having their picture taken by some tourists at Niagara Falls, Honeymoon Suite's hometown.  The photo was taken on the Canadian side of the Falls.

Following the release of this album, the band won the Juno Award for "Group of the Year" and was also nominated for "Album of the Year" in 1986.

In a 2008 interview, Honeymoon Suite's guitarist Derry Grehan said "I think our best record was The Big Prize."

Background and writing
Following the success of their debut album and a subsequent two-year tour, Honeymoon Suite wrote much of their next album on the road. The Big Prize was produced by Bruce Fairbairn with assistance from fellow Canadian Bob Rock and featured the trademark 80s sound of rock guitars interlaced with keyboards.

The first single "Bad Attitude" was written by guitarist Derry Grehan, and according to singer Johnnie Dee "Derry was playing this lick for a long time and eventually wrote this song around it. The chorus wouldn't come together for us until Bruce Fairbairn helped us out. The lyrics kinda summed up our feelings at the time."

The second single released was "Feel It Again," written by keyboardist Ray Coburn.  This tune became the band's first, and only single to date to crack the Billboard Top 40 Chart in the States.  It was also extremely successful at home in Canada.

The third single was the power ballad "What Does It Take" and was originally written on a Fostex recorder at a gig in Sarnia, Ontario. The song was added to the soundtrack for the movie One Crazy Summer.

It was Bob Rock's production work on this record (specifically as an engineer) that is largely credited with helping him get noticed by Jon Bon Jovi. Rock engineered Bon Jovi's massive break-out album Slippery When Wet, which was a major launching point in Rock's engineering and producing career.

Track listing 

All songs written by Derry Grehan except where noted.

"Bad Attitude" - 5:28
"Feel It Again" (Ray Coburn) - 4:37
"Lost and Found" (Coburn) - 4:22
"What Does It Take" - 4:13
"One By One" - 3:42
"Wounded" (Johnnie Dee) - 4:36
"Words in the Wind" - 4:35
"All Along You Knew" - 4:19
"Once the Feeling" - 4:32
"Take My Hand" - 3:41

Singles
The following singles were released from the album, with the highest charting positions listed.

Album credits

Personnel
Johnnie Dee - lead vocals
Derry Grehan - guitars, vocals
Ray Coburn - keyboards
Gary Lalonde - bass
Dave Betts - drums
Ian Anderson - flute on "All Along You Knew"
Mickey Curry - additional percussion
Chris Taylor - additional percussion

Production
Bruce Fairbairn - producer
Bob Rock - engineer
Michael Larkin - assistant engineer
Johnnie Q. - assistant engineer
Mike Fraser - assistant engineer
Mixed at the Farmyard Studios, Bucks, England by Stephen W. Tayler

References
 Liner notes from Honeymoon Suite:The Singles.

1985 albums
Honeymoon Suite albums
Albums produced by Bruce Fairbairn